Robert Pierpoint may refer to:
 Robert Pierpoint (journalist) (1925–2011), American broadcast journalist
 Robert Pierpoint (British politician) (1845–1932), member of parliament for Warrington
 Robert Pierpoint (Vermont politician) (1791–1864), Vermont politician and lawyer

See also
Robert Pierrepont (disambiguation)